Mario Martín Delgado Carrillo (born 17 June 1972) is a Mexican politician affiliated with the National Regeneration Movement (MORENA). Since 5 November 2020 he has served as the party's president.

He previously served as a senator representing Mexico City from 2012 to 2018 during the LXII and LXIII Legislatures of the Mexican Congress, and then as a deputy representing the 13th federal electoral district for Mexico City during the LXIV Legislature of the Mexican Congress before resigning to become president of MORENA. On 5 November 2020 he was replaced by his substitute Oscar Gutiérrez Camacho.

References

1972 births
Living people
Politicians from Colima City
Senators of the LXII and LXIII Legislatures of Mexico
Party of the Democratic Revolution politicians
21st-century Mexican politicians
Morena (political party) politicians
Deputies of the LXIV Legislature of Mexico
Instituto Tecnológico Autónomo de México alumni
Alumni of the University of Essex
Members of the Chamber of Deputies (Mexico) for Mexico City
Members of the Senate of the Republic (Mexico) for Mexico City